General Honor Decoration may refer to:
General Honor Decoration (Hesse)
General Honor Decoration (Prussia)